BC MIA Academy is a professional basketball club based in Tbilisi, that plays in the Georgian Superliga. The club is affiliated to the Georgian Ministry of Internal Affairs, and plays its home games in the Tbilisi Sports Palace.

History
BC MIA Academy was founded in 2008, intending to provide MIA employees with an opportunity to play basketball at a professional level. However, funding was gradually increased during the following seasons, allowing the club to acquire more experienced Georgian players, as well as foreign imports, and to set themselves more ambitious targets. Success failed to materialise initially, with the club failing to advance beyond the quarterfinal stage in the championship play-offs, or to win any other domestic tournaments until the 2012/2013 season. In that season, however, MIA Academy managed to win the domestic double of Georgian Superleague and the Georgian Cup. A reduction in funding led to the departure of foreign players, as well as the title-winning head coach Giorgos Ketselidis, with the club going into the following season with a young all-Georgian side.

Current roster

References

External links
  Eurobasket.com Team Profile
  Superleague.ge Team Profile

Basketball teams in Georgia (country)